The Roman Catholic Diocese of Mysore is a suffragan Latin diocese, in the Ecclesiastical province of Bangalore in southern India, yet depends on the missionary Dicastery for Evangelization. Its cathedral episcopal see is St. Philomena's Cathedral in the city of Mysore in Karnataka.

Statistics
As per 2014, it pastorally served 105,113 Catholics (1.0% of 10,056,000 total) on 21,051 km2 in 77 parishes with 157 priests (114 diocesan, 43 religious), 1,224 lay religious (309 brothers, 915 sisters) and 19 seminarians.

History
 Established on 16 March 1845 as a Pro-Vicariate of Mysore - Bangalore, on territory split off (depending on the source) either from the Apostolic Vicariate of Pondicherry or from the then Apostolic Vicariate of Madura and Coromandel Coast (now Diocese of Tiruchirapalli)
 Promoted on 3 April 1850 as the Apostolic Vicariate of Mysore - Bangalore
 Promoted on 1 September 1886 as Diocese of Mysore - Bangalore  in the Ecclesiastical Metropolitan Province of Pondicherry
 Lost territories repeatedly : on 12 June 1923 to establish Diocese of Calicut, on 26 May 1930 to establish Diocese of Salem, on 13 February 1940 to establish Diocese of Bangalore, on 3 July 1955 to establish Diocese of Ootacamund and on 16 November 1963 to establish Diocese of Chikmagalur.

Episcopal ordinaries
(all Latin Rite; until 1963 European members of a Latin missionary congregation)

Apostolic Vicars of Mysore  
 Étienne-Louis Charbonnaux, Paris Foreign Missions Society (M.E.P.) (born France) (3 April 1850 – death 23 June 1873), Titular Bishop of Iassus (8 July 1844 – 23 June 1873), previously as Coadjutor Apostolic Vicar of Verapoly (India) (8 July 1844 – 3 April 1850)
 Joseph-Auguste Chevalier, M.E.P. (born France) (11 November 1873 – death 25 March 1880), Titular Bishop of Germanicopolis (11 November 1873 – 25 March 1880)
 Jean-Yves-Marie Coadou, M.E.P. (born France) (20 August 1880 – 25 November 1886 see below), Titular Bishop of Chrysopolis in Arabia (20 August 1880 – 1 September 1886)

Suffragan Bishops of Mysore 
 Jean-Yves-Marie Coadou, M.E.P. (see above 25 November 1886 – death 14 September 1890)
 Eugène-Louis Kleiner, M.E.P. (born France) (14 September 1890 – retired 2 June 1910), succeeding as former Titular Bishop of Lyrba (20 June 1890 – 14 September 1890) as Coadjutor Bishop of Mysore (20 June 1890 – 14 September 1890); on emeritate Titular Bishop of Tlous (17 June 1910 – death 19 August 1915) 
 Augustin-François Baslé, M.E.P. (born France) (2 June 1910 – death 13 September 1915), succeeding as former Titular Bishop of Calynda (15 December 1905 – 2 June 1910) as Coadjutor Bishop of Mysore (15 December 1905 – 2 June 1910)
 Hippolyte Teissier, M.E.P. (born France) (4 September 1916 – death 26 February 1922)
 Maurice-Bernard-Benoit-Joseph Despatures, M.E.P. (born France) (21 June 1922 – 13 February 1940); next Bishop of Bangalore (India) (13 February 1940 – 6 September 1942), emeritate as Titular Bishop of Benda (6 September 1942 – death 26 August 1963)
 René-Jean-Baptiste-Germain Feuga, M.E.P. (born France) (3 April 1941 – retired 20 November 1962), stayed on as Apostolic Administrator 20 November 1962 – 16 November 1963) while on emeritates as Titular Bishop of Fornos major (20 November 1962 – death 27 January 1964)
  Sebastião Francisco Mathias Fernandes (first native incumbent) (16 November 1963 – death 9 May 1985)
 Francis Michaelappa (from 22 December 1986 until his death on 17 March 1993)
 Joseph Roy (19 December 1994 – retired 12 February 2003); died 2014
 Thomas Antony Vazhapilly (12 February 2003 – retired 25 January 2017)
 Kannikadass William Antony (25 January 2017– present; suspended on 7 January 2023)

Apostolic Administrator
 Bernard Moras (7 January 2023 - present)

References

External links
 Mysore Diocese

Roman Catholic dioceses in India
Christianity in Karnataka
History of Mysore
Religious organizations established in 1850
Roman Catholic dioceses and prelatures established in the 19th century
1850 establishments in India